Carabus parreyssi parreyssi is a subspecies of beetle from family Carabidae, found in Bosnia and Herzegovina, Croatia.

References

parreyssi parreyssi
Beetles described in 1825
Subspecies